The Passenger is a 1975 drama film directed by Michelangelo Antonioni. Written by Antonioni, Mark Peploe, and Peter Wollen, the film is about a disillusioned Anglo-American journalist, David Locke (Jack Nicholson), who assumes the identity of a dead businessman while working on a documentary in Chad, unaware that he is impersonating an arms dealer with connections to the rebels in the current civil war. Along the way, he is accompanied by an unnamed young woman (Maria Schneider). 

The Passenger was the final film in Antonioni's three-picture deal with producer Carlo Ponti and Metro-Goldwyn-Mayer, after Blowup (1966) and Zabriskie Point (1970). During the film's release, it was in competition for the Palme d'Or at the Cannes Film Festival.

Plot
David Locke (Jack Nicholson) is a television journalist making a documentary film about post-colonial Africa. In order to finish the film, he is in the Sahara in northern Chad seeking to meet with and interview rebel fighters who are involved in the Chadian Civil War. Struggling to find rebels to interview, he is further frustrated when his Land Rover gets stuck on a sand dune. After a long walk through the desert back to his hotel, a thoroughly dispirited Locke discovers that an Englishman (Robertson), who has also been staying in the same hotel, and with whom he had struck up a casual friendship, has died overnight in his room from a heart condition.

Locke decides to switch identities with Robertson. Posing as Robertson, Locke reports his own death at the front desk, where the hotel manager mistakes Locke for Robertson, and the plan goes off without a hitch.

In London, Locke's wife Rachel (Jenny Runacre) has been having an affair with a man named Stephen (Steven Berkhoff). Rachel feels guilt-ridden and torn when she is informed of her husband's death, which we see reported in a newspaper obituary. She approaches Locke's friend, Martin (Ian Hendry), a television producer, in an attempt to get in touch with Robertson to try and learn more about her husband's last days. Meanwhile, Locke, posing as Robertson, has flown to Munich with the dead man's belongings, including his appointment book, which directs him to a locker in the airport. It contains a document wallet with a price-list and several photocopied pages illustrating armaments. After leaving the airport, and apparently acting on a whim, Locke follows a white horse and carriage to a wedding in a baroque chapel, where he waits at the back of the congregation. Once the wedding has finished and the guests have gone, two men who were observing Locke at the airport enter and ask why he did not contact them at the airport. They ask for "the documents." After Locke hands them the papers from the locker, they give him an envelope of money and tell him that the second half is to be paid in Barcelona. It becomes apparent that Robertson was gun-running for the same rebels whom Locke had been trying to contact in the Sahara.

Prompted by Robertson's diary entries, Locke flies to Barcelona. There he spots his colleague and friend the TV producer Martin, who tries to track Robertson down on behalf of Rachel. Locke encounters an architecture student (Maria Schneider), credited only as The Girl, while trying to hide in a Gaudi building, La Pedrera. He asks her to fetch his belongings from the hotel so that he won't be seen there by Martin, who is casing the lobby. Martin overhears that she is collecting the baggage, and he confronts her outside, requesting that she take him to meet Robertson. She suggests that he follow her in a taxi, but by luck she manages to lose him. She and Locke leave Barcelona and become lovers on the run.

Flush with cash from the down payment on the arms he cannot deliver, Locke is nevertheless drawn to keep a meeting scheduled in Robertson's diary. His appointed contact, however, does not show up. Meanwhile, the men arranging the arms deal are abducted, interrogated and beaten by hitmen operating for the Chadian government.

Rachel receives Locke's belongings, returned from Africa. Having heard from Martin of his unsuccessful chase of the elusive Robertson, Rachel is shocked as she opens Locke's passport to Robertson's photo pasted inside. She heads to Spain to find Locke. The hitmen trail her. Rachel co-opts the Spanish police in her pursuit, but Locke and The Girl continue to flee. Locke eventually sends her away, instructing her to meet him later in Tangiers, after he follows her advice to keep an appointment in the book, that is, to assume that part of Robertson’s identity that believed in a cause. She departs by bus for Almería.

Reaching the Hotel de la Gloria in the Spanish town of Osuna, Locke finds out that The Girl has returned and booked a double room, posing as Mrs. Robertson. He again tries to persuade her to leave. She exits the hotel and dawdles around the dusty square outside. The Chadian agents arrive at the hotel, enter, and depart just before the police arrive with Rachel Locke. The Girl joins them, and the group enter Locke's room, where they discover that he is dead. When asked by the police whether they recognized him, Rachel says that she never knew him, and the Girl says, "Yes."

Cast

Jack Nicholson as David Locke
Maria Schneider as The Girl
Steven Berkoff as Stephen
Ian Hendry as Martin Knight
Jenny Runacre as Rachel Locke
Ambroise Bia as Achebe
 Charles Mulvehill as David Robertson
 José María Caffarel as Hotel Keeper
 James Campbell as the Witch Doctor
 Manfred Spies as the German Stranger
 Jean-Baptiste Tiemele as Murderer
 Ángel del Pozo as Police inspector

Production

Development
During the 1960s, Michelangelo Antonioni had signed a three-picture deal with producer Carlo Ponti and Metro-Goldwyn-Mayer. His first two films were Blowup (1966) and Zabriskie Point (1970). His third project was tentatively titled Technically Sweet, which was inspired by the 1958 short story titled "L'Avventure di un Fotografo" (translated to "The Adventure of a Photographer") by Italo Calvino. The title had been inspired by J. Robert Oppenheimer's remark on the atomic bomb because of the "technically sweet" theoretical problems it created. Antonioni first wrote a film treatment in 1966, and later wrote a script in collaboration with Mark Peploe, Niccolò Tucci, and Tonino Guerra. After Zabriskie Point (1970) was released, Antonioni spent two years on pre-production work, including location scouting near the Amazon River. 

Jack Nicholson and Maria Schneider had been attached to star in the project. Antonioni had known Nicholson years earlier because Zabriskie Point (1970) and Easy Rider (1969) happened to be filming near each other. Nicholson's co-star Dennis Hopper invited Antonioni to the film's first private screening, after which Antonioni and Nicholson talked at length. Schneider had been cast after receiving an Academy Award nomination for Last Tango in Paris (1972). However, Ponti grew concerned about the enormous cost of location shooting and cancelled the project. In May 1975, Antonioni told the Los Angeles Times that the commercial failure of Zabriskie Point (1970) had factored into the project's cancellation. The script, translated to its Italian title Tecnicamente dolce, was later published by Einaudi in 1976.  

Meanwhile, a low-budget film titled Fatal Exit was in development for Carlo Ponti Productions. The project had been written by Peploe, who was the brother of Antonioni's then-partner, Clare Peploe. Initially, Mark Peploe was to direct the film, with a screenplay written by him and Peter Wollen. However, Ponti instead asked Antonioni to direct the film, mainly because of Peploe's inexperience as a director. Antonioni accepted the offer with Peploe's approval. Antonioni had noticed similarities between Technically Sweet and Peploe's script because it had centered around a photojournalist. However, because of Nicholson's commitment to Chinatown (1974), Antonioni had only six weeks to rewrite the script.

Filming

Principal photography took place in the Illizi Province of Algeria (to depict Chad), London, Munich, Barcelona and locations across south-eastern Spain throughout mid-to-late 1973.   

In a long take early in the film, Locke (Nicholson) is exchanging passport photos in his hotel room, with a tape recording playing an earlier conversation between Locke and Robertson, now dead. The camera pans, without a cut, to hold on Robertson's now live appearance on the balcony, when Locke appears beside him and the two of them continue talking, i.e. an in-camera in-single-shot flashback.

The film's penultimate shot is a seven-minute long take tracking shot which begins in Locke's hotel room, looking out onto a dusty, run-down square, pushes out through the bars of the hotel window into the square, rotates 180 degrees, and finally tracks back to a close exterior view of the room's interior.
 The location of the hotel is stated to be Osuna in the film. However, the bullring at the edge of the square is recognisably that of the one in the Spanish town of Vera, in the province of Almería. In a DVD commentary, decades later, Nicholson said Antonioni built the entire hotel so as to get this shot.
 
 Since the shot was continuous, it was not possible to adjust the lens aperture as the camera left the room and went into the square. Hence the footage had to be taken in the very late afternoon near dusk, in order to minimise the lighting contrast between the brightness outside and that in the room.
 The square was windy and the crew needed stillness to ensure smooth camera movement. Antonioni tried putting the camera in a sphere so the wind might catch it less, but this would not fit through the window. In the scene, it appears that the bars may have been adjusted to be removed as the camera approached them.
 The camera ran on a ceiling track in the hotel room and when it came outside the window, was meant to be picked up by a hook suspended from a giant crane nearly 30 metres high. A system of gyroscopes was fitted on the camera to steady it during the switch from this smooth indoor track to the crane outside. Meanwhile, the bars on the window had been given hinges. When the camera reached the window and the bars were no longer in the field of view, they were swung away to either side. At this time the camera's forward movement had to stop for a few seconds as the crane's hook grabbed it and took over from the track. To hide this, the lens was slowly and smoothly zoomed until the crane could pull the camera forward. Then the cameraman walked the camera in a circle around the square, giving the crew time to shut the window bars before the camera returned to look through the window from the outside this time. Antonioni directed the scene from a van by means of monitors and microphones, talking to assistants who communicated his instructions to the actors and operators.

Although this is often referred to as the "final shot" of the film, there is one more. The last passage shows a small driving school car pulling away in the twilight, and the camera holds on the hotel as the film's credits begin to roll.

Release
The Passenger was released by Metro-Goldwyn-Mayer in the United States on 9 April 1975. Years since the film's release, Nicholson had developed and planned to star in a film project, but MGM abandoned the project. Nicholson demanded compensation, to which MGM relinquished The Passenger to Nicholson's ownership. For nearly three decades, Nicholson kept the film from circulation, although the film was briefly released on videocassette during the 1980s. In 2003, Sony Pictures Classics approached Nicholson with an offer to restore and re-release the film. On 28 October 2005, the film was given a limited release in the United States. The film was released on DVD on 25 April 2006.

Reception
Vincent Canby of The New York Times wrote the film was "a suspense melodrama, a story so basically conventional that it isn't until you're at least half‐way through it you realize it's a magnificent nightmare, and that you are on the inside looking out." Gene Siskel of the Chicago Tribune gave the film a complete four-star review, stating "The Passenger is a complex film that is obvious only in its physical beauty. And if you don't hook into that cerebral adventure story, you'll probably find the pace of the chase story to be much too slow. Viewers who connect to that other layer, however, will find a remarkable richness of image and idea ... Nicholson turns in another superior performance, managing to communicate his own brand of wise anger without puncturing Antonioni's grand design." Jay Cocks, reviewing for Time magazine, praised for the film's cinematography, writing the film "has some of the boldest and most supple imagery that Antonioni has achieved in years — more memorable than anything in Blow-Up or the unfortunate Zabriskie Point ... The Passenger ends with a scene that seems destined for cinematic history." 

Kevin Thomas of the Los Angeles Times called the film "a masterpiece of visual beauty and rigorous artistry that is as tantalizing as it is hypnotic. It is a major achievement by one of the world's great film-makers and boasts still another of those splendid portrayals from Nicholson". Penelope Gilliatt of The New Yorker called the film a "triumph of technical invention that stretches the wizardly vocabulary of film as he has never stretched it before". Hank Werba of Variety wrote Antonioni "laboriously hand-fashioned an excellent film spectacle that is so marked by his own style and anguish reflections on contemporary life as to encourage further collaborative encounters." 

Roger Ebert initially gave the film a negative review in 1975. In 2005, he revisited the film with a more positive review, writing that it was a perceptive look at identity, alienation and the human desire to escape oneself. He also praised Schneider's performance as "a performance of breathtaking spontaneity." John Simon, in his 1983 book Something to Declare, wrote disapprovingly that "Emptiness is everywhere: in landscapes and townscapes, churches and hotel rooms, and most of all in the script. Never was dialogue more pretentiously vacuous, plot more rudimentary yet preposterous, action more haphazard and spasmodic, characterization more tenuous and uninvolving, filmmaking more devoid of all but postures and pretensions".

In 2012, The Passenger was ranked 110th on the Sight & Sound critics' poll. The film was included by Empire magazine as one of The 500 Greatest Movies of All Time. The magazine praised the film's camerawork (by Luciano Tovoli) and the performances, particularly Nicholson's quiet and reflective performance.  On Metacritic, the film has a score of 90 based on 20 reviews, indicating "universal acclaim".

References

Bibliography

External links
Official website 

 

1975 films
1970s drama road movies
Films about identity theft
Films about journalists
Films directed by Michelangelo Antonioni
Films set in Barcelona
Films set in Chad
Films shot in London
Italian drama road movies
Metro-Goldwyn-Mayer films
Films produced by Carlo Ponti
Films shot in Algeria
Films shot in Munich
Films shot in Almería
English-language French films
English-language Italian films
1975 drama films
1970s Italian films